Argoat is the inland part of Brittany in France, in opposition to the coast, Armor. Its name is derived from Breton « ar » (next to) and « koad » (forest, wood). A literal translation would be "[the land] in front of or along the forest edge". It designates lightly wooded land or Bocage.

Geography of Brittany